The Longhand Dreamer, Chirophryne xenolophus is a species of dreamer known from the western Pacific Ocean, and the western North Atlantic Ocean, at a depth range of 1230-1400m. It was named and described in 1932 by Regan and Ethelwynn Trewavas. It has a body length of 6.4cm.

References
 

Oneirodidae
Taxa named by Charles Tate Regan
Taxa named by Ethelwynn Trewavas
Fish described in 1932